This is a list of members of the Victorian Legislative Assembly from 1937 to 1940, as elected at the 1937 state election.

 In April 1938, the Country member for Ouyen, Albert Bussau, resigned to take up an appointment as Agent-General for Victoria in London. Country candidate Keith Dodgshun was elected unopposed as his replacement in May 1938.
 On 29 April 1938, the Labor member for Geelong, William Brownbill, died. His widow, Labor candidate Fanny Brownbill, won the resulting by-election on 4 June 1938, becoming the first woman Labor MP in Victoria.
 On 18 September 1938, the Independent member for Gippsland North, James McLachlan, died. Country candidate Alexander Borthwick won the resulting by-election on 5 November 1938.
 On 6 May 1939, the UAP member for Hawthorn, John Austin Gray, died. UAP candidate Les Tyack won the resulting by-election on 10 June 1939.

Sources
 Re-member (a database of all Victorian MPs since 1851). Parliament of Victoria.

Members of the Parliament of Victoria by term
20th-century Australian politicians